Maria Dibiasi is an Italian luger who competed in the early 1970s. A natural track luger, she won the bronze medal in the women's singles event at the 1970 FIL European Luge Natural Track Championships in Kapfenberg, Austria.

References
Natural track European Championships results 1970-2006.

Italian female lugers
Possibly living people
Year of birth missing
Italian lugers